Madda Walabu University, one of the public universities in Ethiopia, was established in 2006. The university has 46 undergraduate and 28 postgraduate programs.

History 
Historically the place is closely related to the Oromo people. It is the cradle of Oromo civilization and the birthplace of the Gadaa system. It also produced numerous Oromo heroes. Becauase of its deep rooted value for Oromo people, the name Madda Walabu is commonly used by Madda Walabu Stadium, Madda Walabu Cultural band, Madda Walabu University itself and other smaller business centers named after this unique place.

Schools and colleges 
The university has ten schools, one institute and one college. The schools and colleges are:

College of Agriculture 

 Animal and Range Science
 Plant Science
 Rural Development
 Agricultural Extension

College of Social Science 
 History and Heritage Management 
 Geography and Environmental Studies 
 Civics and Ethical Studies
 Journalism and Communication 
 Afan Oromo Language and Literature 
 English Language and Literature 
 Amharic Language and Literature 
 Sociology

College of Business and Economics 
 Department of Economics
 Department of Accounting
 Department of Business Management
Department of Marketing Management
 Department of Tourism Management

School of Language Studies
 English Language and Literature
 Amharic Language and Literature
 Afan Oromo and Literature
 Journalism and Communication

College of Natural science 
 Physics
 Chemistry
 Biology

Institute of Technology
Has Two Colleges

College of Engineering

 Civil Engineering Department
 Mechanical Engineering Department
 Electrical Engineering Department
 Construction Technology and Management
 Surveying Engineering Department
 Water Resource and Irrigation Engineering Department

College of Computing
 Information Systems
 Computer Science
 Information Science
 Information Technology
 Software Engeneering 

Edited by Temesgen.C

School of Mathematical Science 
 Mathematics
 Statistics

School of Behavioural Sciences 
 Sociology 
 Psychology
Madda Walabu University School of Law was launched in 2011 and had begun its academic activities with 37 degree regular and 47 extension program students. Today, more than 100 students are attending the regular LL.B program. Upon its establishment, the School had only three full-time instructors but currently one Assistant Professor and more than 21 senior academic staffs are actively engage in teaching, research and community services activities. The school has an honored experience of providing free legal service for all vulnerable groups of the services in its five centers in collaboration with Oromia Supreme Court, Bale Zone High Court and West Arsi Zone High Court. On the other hand, the School is a founding member of Ethiopian Law Schools Association and has been an active participant in the Ethiopian Law schools’ consortium since 2012.

School of Biodiversity and Natural Resource 
 Natural Resource Management (NRM)
 Forestry
 Ecotourism and Biodiversity Conservation (ETBC)

School of Agriculture 
 Animal and Range Science
 Plant Science
 Rural Development
 Agricultural Extension

College of Medicine
 Medicine 
 Public Health/Health Officer
 Nursing
 Midwifery

Institute of Pedagogical Science

Graduate Studies 
 Environmental Science
 Teaching English as a foreign Language (TEFL)
 Applied Micro Biology
 Master of Business Administration (MBA)
 Biodiversity

References 

Educational institutions established in 2006
2006 establishments in Ethiopia
Universities and colleges in Oromia Region